The Centro Sportivo Esercito (sometimes known as Gruppo Sportivo Esercito or with the acronym CSE), is the sport section of the Italian Army.

History
Centro Sportivo Esercito was born on 1 January 1960 on the occasion of the 1960 Summer Olympics that took place in Rome.

Sections
Olympic Sports Center of the Italian Army
Alpine Training Centre - Sports Activities Department
Section Parachuting of the Centro Sportivo Esercito
Military Centre of Equestrianism
Section Powerboating of the 2° Reggimento Genio Pontieri

Sports
There are 17 disciplines and 5 sections.

Notables athletes

Alpine skiing
Camilla Alfieri
Giuliano Razzoli

Artistic gymnastics
Vanessa Ferrari

Athletics
Elisa Cusma
Daniele Meucci
Marta Milani

Biathlon
Dominik Windisch

Cross-country skiing
Marco Albarello
Francesco De Fabiani
Magda Genuin

Swimming
Fabio Scozzoli
Dario Verani

Best results

See also
Italian military sports bodies
Athletes of Gruppo Sportivo Esercito

References

External links
   

Athletics clubs in Italy
Sports organizations established in 1960
1960 establishments in Italy